This article provides details of international football matches played by the Faroe Islands national football team from 2020 to present.

Results

2020

2021

2022

Notes

References

Faroe Islands national football team
2020s in Faroese sport